ZetaGrid was at one time the largest distributed computing project, designed to explore the non-trivial roots of the Riemann zeta function, checking over one billion roots a day.

Roots of the zeta function are of particular interest in mathematics, since the presence of even a single one that is out of line with the rest would disprove the Riemann hypothesis, with far-reaching consequences for all of mathematics. So far, every single one of them has failed to provide a counterexample to the Riemann hypothesis.

The project ended in November 2005 due to instability of the hosting provider. Over  1013 first zeroes were checked. After the results were analyzed, the project administrator were posted on the American Mathematical Society website.

References

External links 
 Home page (Web archive)

Grid computing
Zeta and L-functions
Hilbert's problems
Experimental mathematics